The Bank of America Center, also known as the Bank of America Financial Center and One Financial Center, is located at 101–177 Southwest Morrison Street in Portland, Oregon, United States. Construction began in 1985 and was completed in 1987. The 18-story building has 350,000 feet of office space. It was designed by architect Greg Baldwin.

References

External links
 

1987 establishments in Oregon
Bank of America
Buildings and structures completed in 1987
Skyscrapers in Portland, Oregon
Southwest Portland, Oregon